A drug cartel is any criminal organization with the intention of supplying drug trafficking operations. They range from loosely managed agreements among various drug traffickers to formalized commercial enterprises. The term was applied when the largest trafficking organizations reached an agreement to coordinate the production and distribution. The term is used to refer to any criminal narcotics related organization.

The basic structure of a drug cartel is as follows:

 Falcons (Spanish: Halcones): Considered as the "eyes and ears" of the streets, the "falcons" are the lowest rank in any drug cartel. They are scouts, who are responsible for conducting reconnaissance and for reporting the activities of the police, the military and rival groups.
 Hitmen (Spanish: Sicarios): The armed group within the drug cartel, responsible for carrying out assassinations, kidnappings, thefts and extortions, operating protection rackets, as well as defending their plaza (turf) from rival groups and the military.
 Lieutenants (Spanish: Tenientes): The second highest position in the drug cartel organization, responsible for supervising the hitmen and falcons within their own territory. They are allowed to carry out low-profile murders without permission from their bosses.
 Drug lords (Spanish: Capos): The highest position in any drug cartel, responsible for supervising the entire drug industry, appointing territorial leaders, making alliances, in addition to planning high-profile murders.

There are other operating groups within the drug cartels. For example, the drug producers and suppliers, although not considered in the basic structure, are critical operators of any drug cartel, along with the smugglers, distributors, sales representatives, accountants and money launderers. Furthermore, the arms suppliers operate in a completely different circle; they are technically not considered part of the cartel's logistics.

Africa

Cape Verdean organized crime
Mungiki
Organized crime in Nigeria
Confraternities in Nigeria
Black Axe (organized crime group)
Anini gang
Mai-Mai militia gangs
Moroccan hashish smugglers
Ahmed organization

Americas

North America

Canada
Rivard organization
Red Scorpions
Bacon Brothers
Montreal
West End Gang
Blass gang
Dubois Brothers
Punjabi-Canadian organized crime
Punjabi Mafia ਜੌਹਲ ਗਿਰੋਹ (Canada)
Canadian mafia families
Rizzuto crime family
Cuntrera-Caruana Mafia clan
Cotroni crime family
Musitano crime family
Papalia crime family
Luppino crime family
Perri crime family
Siderno Group
Commisso 'ndrina

Mexico

Mexican cartels (also known in Mexico as: la Mafia (the mafia or the mob), La Maña (the skill / the bad manners), narcotraficantes (narco-traffickers), or simply as narcos usually refers to several, rival, criminal organizations that are combated by the Mexican government in the Mexican War on Drugs (List sorted by branches and heritage): 

Note: As of 2020 the DEA considered the cartels of Sinaloa-Beltran, Juarez-Linea, Jalisco, Golfo-Noreste-Zetas, La Familia and Rojos-Guerreros to be the most influential cartels in Mexico.

 Gulf Cartel (The oldest Mexican criminal syndicate, started as Prohibition-era bootlegging gang)
 Los Zetas (Formerly part of the Gulf Cartel, now independent)
 La Familia Michoacana (Formerly a branch of the Gulf Cartel, then went independent) (Disbanded)
 Knights Templar Cartel (Splintered from La Familia Cartel)
 Guadalajara Cartel (The first full-fledged Mexican drug cartel, from which most of the big cartels spawned; disbanded in 1989)
 Sinaloa Cartel (Spawned from the Guadalajara Cartel)
 Colima Cartel (members are now a branch of the Sinaloa Cartel)
 Sonora Cartel (was reformed in 2018 and is still a branch of the Sinaloa Cartel)
 Artistas Asesinos (hitman squad; disbanded)
 Gente Nueva (Sinaloa cell in Chihuahua; disbanded)
 Los Ántrax (enforcer squad)
 Milenio Cartel (First loyal to the Sinaloa Cartel federation, later independent; disbanded)
 La Resistencia (Splintered from the Milenio Cartel; disbanded)
 Jalisco New Generation Cartel (Independent remnants of the Milenio Cartel)
 Beltrán-Leyva Organization (Formerly part of the Sinaloa Cartel federation, later independent; disbanded)
 Los Negros (Beltran-Leyva enforcement squad; isbanded)
 South Pacific Cartel (branch of the Beltran Leyva Cartel in Morelos)
 Cártel del Centro (cell of the Beltran-Leyva Cartel in Mexico City) (Disbanded)
Independent Cartel of Acapulco (Splinter from the Beltran-Leyva Cartel)
La Barredora (gang)
El Comando Del Diablo (gang) (Hitman squad of la Barredora) (Disbanded)
La Mano Con Ojos (gang) (small cell of Beltran-Leyva members in the State of Mexico) (Disbanded)
La Nueva Administración (Splintered from the Beltran-Leyva Cartel) (Disbanded)
La Oficina (gang) (cell of the Beltran-Leyva Cartel in Aguascalientes) (Disbanded)
Cártel de la Sierra (cell in Guerrero)
Cártel de La Calle (cell in Chiapas)
Los Chachos (gang in Tamaulipas) (Disbanded)
Tijuana Cartel (Spawned from the Guadalajara Cartel)
Oaxaca Cartel (Was a branch of the disbanded Tijuana Cartel, its regional leader was captured in 2007)
Juárez Cartel (Spawned from the Guadalajara Cartel)
La Línea (Juárez Cartel enforcer squad)  
Barrio Azteca (U.S. street gang) (Allied with La Linea)
 Santa Rosa de Lima Cartel
 Caborca Cartel
Lesser-known small-criminal organizations:
Los Mexicles  (U.S. street gang)
 Los Texas (street gang) (disbanded)
Government officials: Other organizations that have been involved in drug trade or traffic in Mexico:
Mexican officials:
Municipal, state, and Federal Police forces in Mexico
Mexican Armed Forces (Army and Navy)
Mexico City International Airport
Club Xoloitzcuintles (football)
United States officials:
Federal Bureau of Investigation (FBI)
Texas National Guard
U.S. Customs and Border Protection
United States Immigration and Naturalization Service

United States

The United States of America is the world's largest consumer of cocaine and other illegal drugs.  This is a list of American criminal organizations involved in illegal drug traffic, drug trade and other related crimes in the United States:

National Crime Syndicate
Seven Group
Murder, Inc.
Polish Mob
Saltis-McErlane Gang
Kielbasa Posse
The Greenpoint Crew
Flats Mob
The Flathead gang
Prohibition-era gangs
Galveston
Downtown Gang
Beach Gang
The Maceo syndicate
Shelton Brothers Gang
Sheldon Gang
Broadway Mob
The Lanzetta Brothers
Circus Cafe Gang
Wandering Family
Remus organization
Hispanic-American
Marielitos
The Corporation

 Paisas
 Nuestra Familia

 Crips or Locs
 Vamo Crew or Osprey boys
 Bloods or B Dogs 
 Surenos or SUR 13
 Nortenos or Norte 14
Puerto Rican mafia
Agosto organization
La ONU
Martinez Familia Sangeros
Solano organization
Negri organization
Márquez gambling ring
Polanco-Rodriguez organization
Los Angeles (See also Rampart scandal)
Nash gang
Wonderland Gang
Dixie Mafia
Cornbread Mafia
Greek-American organized crime
Philadelphia Greek Mob
Velentzas Family
Assyrian/Chaldean mafia
Hawaii
The Company
Leota mob
Wall gang
Elkins mob
The Chickens and the Bulls
Binion mob
Johnston gang

American Mafia
Italian immigrants to the United States in the early 19th century formed various small-time gangs which gradually evolved into sophisticated crime syndicates which dominated organized crime in America for several decades. Although government crackdowns and a less-tightly knit Italian-American community have largely reduced their power, they remain an active force in the underworld.

Active crime families
American Mafia
The Commission
The Five Families of New York City
Bonanno
Indelicato crew
The Motion Lounge Crew
Colombo
Scarpa crew
Genovese
116th Street Crew
Greenwich Village Crew
New Jersey Crew
Gambino
Ozone Park Boys
DeMeo crew
Baltimore Crew
South Florida faction
New Jersey faction
The Bergin Crew
Cherry Hill Gambinos
Lucchese
The Jersey Crew
The Vario Crew
107th Street gang
Magaddino crime family
DeCavalcante crime family
The Chicago Outfit (see also Unione Siciliane)
Las Vegas crew (defunct)
Philadelphia crime family
Pittsburgh crime family
Patriarca crime family
Angiulo Brothers crew
Cleveland crime family
Los Angeles crime family
Kansas City crime family
Trafficante crime family
Detroit Partnership
Milwaukee crime family
New Orleans crime family

Defunct mafia families
Morello crime family
Genna crime family
Porrello crime family
St. Louis crime family
Rochester Crime Family
Bufalino crime family
Dallas crime family
Denver crime family
San Francisco crime family
San Jose crime family
Seattle crime family
Omaha crime family
Licavoli Mob
Cardinelli gang
New York Camorra
East Harlem Purple Gang

Jewish mafia
New York City
Schultz gang
The Bugs and Meyer Mob
Shapiro Brothers
Yiddish Black Hand
Rothstein organization
Kaplan gang
Rosenzweig gang
Boston
69th Street Gang
Sagansky organization
Solomon organization
Los Angeles
Cohen crime family (mix between Jewish and Italian members)
The Purple Gang
Zwillman gang
Kid Cann's gang
Birger mob
Cleveland Syndicate

African-American organized crime
New York City
The Council
Harlem numbers racket
Bumpy Johnson gang
Supreme Team
The Bebos
The Country Boys
Matthews Organization
The Family
Detroit
Black Mafia Family
Young Boys, Inc.
Chambers Brothers
Philadelphia
Black Mafia
Junior Black Mafia
Oakland, California
69 Mob
Baltimore
Williams organization (drug trafficking)
Washington, D.C.
Rayful Edmond organization
Chicago
Theodore Roe's gambling ring
Stokes organization
Atlantic City
Aso Posse
Miami
Miami Boys
Rosemond Organization

Irish Mob
Prohibition-era Chicago gangs
North Side Gang
James Patrick O'Leary organization
John Patrick Looney gang
Valley Gang
Ragen's Colts
Touhy gang
Boston
Mullen Gang
Winter Hill Gang
Gustin Gang
Charlestown Mob
Killeen gang
Danny Hogan's gang
Danny Walsh gang
Tom Dennison empire
Danny Greene's Celtic Club
Nucky Johnson's Organization
K&A Gang
Enright gang
New York
Dwyer gang
The Westies
White Hand Gang
Higgins gang
St Louis
Hogan Gang
Egan's Rats

Caribbean

Chadee gang (Trinidad and Tobago)
Jamaican Yardies & Posses
Shower Posse
POW Posse
Tottenham Mandem
Star Gang
Klans Massive
No Limit Soldiers
Phantom death squad (Guyana)
Zoe Pound (Haitian, see also Tonton Macoute)
 Dominican drug cartels
Paulino organization
Féliz organization

South America

Brazil
Primeiro Comando da Capital, based in São Paulo
Comando Vermelho, based in Rio de Janeiro
Terceiro Comando, based in Rio de Janeiro (disbanded)
Terceiro Comando Puro, based in Rio de Janeiro
Amigos dos Amigos, based in Rio de Janeiro
Família do Norte, based in Amazonas
Guardiões do Estado, based in Ceará

Bolivia
Bolivian drug cartels (See also García Meza regime drug trafficking)
Chapare Cartel
La Corporación
Santa Cruz Cartel

Colombia

Colombia is the largest producer of cocaine on the planet, and cocaine production in Colombia reached an all-time high in 2017.

Active Colombian drug cartels:

The Black Eagles
Clan del Golfo
Oficina de Envigado  
National Liberation Army (Colombia)
FARC dissidents 
Los Rastrojos

Historical Colombian drug cartels:

Medellín Cartel
Cali Cartel
Norte del Valle Cartel
North Coast Cartel 
United Self-Defense Forces of Colombia
Revolutionary Armed Forces of Colombia

Peru
Peruvian drug cartels (see also Vladimiro Montesinos)
Zevallos organisation

Venezuela
Historically Venezuela has been a path to the United States for illegal drugs originating in Colombia, through Central America and Mexico and Caribbean countries such as Haiti, the Dominican Republic, and Puerto Rico.

According to the United Nations, there has been an increase of cocaine trafficking through Venezuela since 2002. In 2005, Venezuela severed ties with the United States Drug Enforcement Administration (DEA), accusing its representatives of spying. Following the departure of the DEA from Venezuela and the expansion of DEA's partnership with Colombia in 2005, Venezuela became more attractive to drug traffickers. Between 2008 and 2012, Venezuela's cocaine seizure ranking among other countries declined, going from being ranked fourth in the world for cocaine seizures in 2008 to sixth in the world in 2012.
The cartel groups involved include:

 The Cuntrera-Caruana Mafia clan moved to Venezuela, which became an important hideout as the clan bought hotels and founded various businesses in Caracas and Valencia, as well as an extended ranch in Barinas, near the Colombian border. "Venezuela has its own Cosa Nostra family as if it is Sicilian territory," according to the Italian police. "The structure and hierarchy of the Mafia has been entirely reproduced in Venezuela." The Cuntrera-Caruana clan had direct links with the ruling Commission of the Sicilian Mafia, and are acknowledged by the American Cosa Nostra.

Pasquale, Paolo and Gaspare Cuntrera were expelled from Venezuela in 1992, "almost secretly smuggled out of the country, as if it concerned one of their own drug transports. It was 
imperative they could not contact people on the outside who could have used their political connections to stop the expulsion." Their expulsion was ordered by a commission of the Venezuelan Senate headed by Senator Cristobal Fernandez Dalo and his money laundering investigator, Thor Halvorssen Hellum. They were arrested in September 1992 at Fiumicino airport (Rome), and in 1996 were sentenced to 13–20 years.

 Norte del Valle Cartel : In 2008 the leader of the Colombian Norte del Valle Cartel, Wilber Varela, was found murdered in a hotel in Mérida in Venezuela. In 2010, Venezuela arrested and deported to the United States Jaime Alberto "Beto" Marin, then head of the Norte del Valle Cartel.
 The Cartel of the Suns According to Jackson Diehl. Deputy Editorial Page Editor of The Washington Post, the Bolivarian government of Venezuela shelters "one of the world’s biggest drug cartels". There have also been allegations that former president Hugo Chávez and  Diosdado Cabello being involved with drug trafficking.

In May 2015, The Wall Street Journal reported from United States officials that drug trafficking in Venezuela increased significantly with Colombian drug traffickers moving from Colombia to Venezuela due to pressure from law enforcement. One United States Department of Justice official described the higher ranks of the Venezuelan government and military as "a criminal organization", with high ranking Venezuelan officials, such as National Assembly President Diosdado Cabello, being accused of drug trafficking. Those involved with investigations stated that Venezuelan government defectors and former traffickers had given information to investigators and that details of those involved in government drug trafficking were increasing.

Central America

Honduras

Honduran drug cartels
Matta organization
Cachiros

El Salvador
Mara Salvatrucha

Nicaragua
Nicaraguan drug cartels (see also Contras)
Oscar Danilo Blandón

Asia

East Asia

Korea

Korean criminal organizations (see also North Korea's illicit activities)

Japan

Japanese criminal organizations
See also Kenji Doihara's criminal activities

The yakuza of Japan are similar to the Italian mafias in that they originated centuries ago and follow a rigid set of traditions, but have several aspects that make them unique, such as their full-body tattoos and their fairly open place in Japanese society. Many yakuza groups are umbrella organizations, smaller gangs reporting to a larger crime syndicate.

Active yakuza groups
Roku-daime Yamaguchi-gumi 六代目山口組
Yon-daime Yamaken-gumi 四代目山健組
Ni-daime Kodo-kai 二代目弘道会
Ni-daime Takumi-gumi 二代目宅見組
Go-daime Kokusui-kai 五代目國粹会
Inagawa-kai 稲川会
 Sumiyoshi-kai 住吉会
Sumiyoshi-ikka Shinwa-kai 住吉一家親和会
Kansuke Juni-daime 勘助十二代目
Kobe Yamaguchi-gumi
Matsuba-kai 松葉会
Kyokuto-kai 極東会
Dojin-kai 道仁会
Kitamura-gumi
Yon-daime Kudo-kai 四代目工藤會
Roku-daime Aizu-Kotetsu-kai 六代目会津小鉄会
Okinawa Kyokuryu-kai 沖縄旭琉会
Kyushu Seido-kai 九州誠道会
Go-daime Kyosei-kai 五代目共政会
San-daime Fukuhaku-kai 三代目福博会
Soai-kai 双愛会
Yon-daime Kyokuryu-kai 四代目旭琉会
San-daime Kyodo-kai 三代目俠道会
Taishu-kai 太州会
Shichi-daime Goda-ikka 七代目合田一家
Toa-kai 東亜会
Ni-daime Azuma-gumi 二代目東組
Yon-daime Asano-gumi 四代目浅野組
Hachi-daime Sakaume-gumi 八代目酒梅組
Yon-daime Kozakura-ikka 四代目小桜一家
Ni-daime Shinwa-kai 二代目親和会

Defunct yakuza groups
Kantō-kai 関東会
Ni-daime Honda-kai 二代目本多会
Yamaguchi-gumi
Goto-gumi 後藤組
Suishin-kai 水心会
Ichiwa-kai 一和会
San-daime Yamano-kai 三代目山野会
Nakano-kai 中野会
Kyokuto Sakurai-soke-rengokai 極東桜井總家連合会

Chinese

The Triads is a popular name for a number of Chinese criminal secret societies, which have existed in various forms over the centuries (see for example Tiandihui). However, not all Chinese gangs fall into line with these traditional groups, as many non-traditional criminal organizations have formed, both in China and the Chinese diaspora.

Hong Kong-based Triads
 14K Group 十四K
 Wo Group 和字頭
 Wo Shing Wo 和勝和
 Wo On Lok (Shui Fong) 和安樂(水房)
 Wo Hop To 和合圖(老和)
 Sun Yee On 新義安(老新)
 Luen Group 聯字頭
 Big Circle Gang 大圈
 Sio Sam Ong (小三王)
 Chinese-American gangs (See also Tongs)
 Wah Ching 華青
 Ping On
 Black Dragons 黑龍
 Jackson Street Boys 積臣街小子
Taiwan-based Triads
United Bamboo Gang 竹聯幫
Four Seas Gang 四海幫
Celestial Alliance
Mainland Chinese crime groups (see also Hanlong Group)
 Chongqing group 重慶組
 Defunct
Honghuzi gangs
 Green Gang 青帮
Triads in Cholon
Wu Bang

Southeast Asia

Golden Triangle
Burmese drug cartels (see also Myanmar Nationalities Democratic Alliance Army)
Khun Sa cartel (see also Mong Tai Army)
Red Wa (see also United Wa State Army and National Democratic Alliance Army)
Hawngleuk Militia
Han cartel
Laotian drug cartels (see also Ouane Rattikone)

Chao pho
Red Wa
Filipino crime gangs (See also Abu Sayyaf and  New People's Army)
Kuratong Baleleng
Waray-Waray gangs
Bahala Na Gang
Sigue Sigue Sputnik
 Defunct
Putik gang
Cambodian crime gangs
Teng Bunma organization
Malaysian crime gangs
Mamak Gang
 Secret societies in Singapore
Ang Soon Tong昂很快塘
Ghee Hin Kongsi 酥油軒懸空寺
Hai San 海新
Wah Kee華記
 Ah Kong 新加坡黑手黨

Vietnamese Xã Hội Đen
Bình Xuyên
Đại Cathay's mafia during the 60s
Năm Cam's mafia of the 90s
Khánh Trắng's "Đồng Xuân Labor Union", a crime syndicate under the guise of a legal entity
Dung Hà's gang
Vũ Xuân Trường's gang: a crime syndicate led by Vũ Xuân Trường, a government official and also a drug lord.

South Asia

Indian mafia (See also Insurgency in Northeast India)
Mumbai
D-Company डी कंपनी
Chhota Rajan gang राजन गिरोह
Gawli gang गवली गिरोह
Bada Rajan gang
Surve gang
Mudaliar gang
Mastan gang
Budesh gang
Kalani gang
Pathan mafia
Lala gang
Uttar Pradesh
Ansari gang
Yadav gang
Bangalore
Rai gang
Ramachandra gang
Jayaraj gang
Kala Kaccha Gang
Chaddi Baniyan Gang
Sri Lankan criminal groups 
Pakistani mafia (See also Peoples' Aman Committee, Tehrik-i-Taliban Pakistan, Muttahida Qaumi Movement and ISI involvement with drugs)
Chotu gang
Lyari Gang
Mafia Raj
Dacoit gangs
Singh gang
Veerappan gang
Devi gang

Middle East

Israeli mafia (see also Stern Gang)
Abergil Crime Family משפחת הפשע אברג'יל
Alperon crime family משפחת הפשע אלפרון
Zeev Rosenstein organization ארגון זאב רוזנשטיין
Palestinian organized crime (See also Abu Nidal Organization)
Doghmush clan
Turkish mafia
Crime groups in Turkey (see also Deep state and Yüksekova Gang)
Kılıç gang
Çakıcı gang
Yaprak Family
Topal organisation
Söylemez Gang
Kurdish clans (see also Kurdistan Workers' Party#Involvement in drug trafficking)
Baybaşin clan
Cantürk crime family
Turkish organised crime in Great Britain
Arifs
Turkish organised crime in Germany
Arabacı clan
İmaç clan (Netherlands)
Iranian organized crime (see also Jundallah and illegal activities of the IRGC)
Tahvili crime family
Lebanese mafia (See also Lebanese Civil War militias)
Arab crime clans
Miri-Clan
Al-Zein Clan
Ibrahim clan

Afghanistan
Golden Crescent
Afridi Network
 Afghan drug cartels (see also Taliban)
 Noorzai Organization
 Khan organization
 Karzai organization (alleged)
 Bagcho organization

Central Asia
Uzbek mafia (See also Islamic Movement of Uzbekistan)
Rakhimov organization
Kyrgyz mafia
Erkinbayev group
Akmatbayev group
Kolbayev group

Eurasia

Russia
Although organized crime existed in the Soviet era, the gangs really gained in power and international reach during the transition to capitalism. The term Russian Mafia, 'mafiya' or mob is a blanket (and somewhat inaccurate) term for the various organized crime groups that emerged in this period from the 15 former republics of the USSR and unlike their Italian counterparts does not mean members are necessarily of Russian ethnicity or uphold any ancient criminal traditions, although this is the case for some members.

Russian-Jewish mafia
Brighton Beach
Agron gang
Nayfeld gang
Balagula gang
Mogilevich organization
Brothers' Circle (Existence is  debatable)
Russian mafia (See also Lubyanka Criminal Group, Three Whales Corruption Scandal and Sergei Magnitsky)
Moscow
Izmaylovskaya gang
Solntsevskaya bratva
New York branch
Orekhovskaya gang
St Petersburg (See also Baltik-Eskort)
Tambov Gang
Togliatti mafia
Uralmash gang
Lazovsky gang
Vladivostok gang
Kurganskaya group
Tsapok gang
'Elephants' group
Kazan gang

Caucasus
See also Caucasus Emirate

Georgian mafia (See also Mkhedrioni and Forest Brothers)
Kutaisi clan
Tbilisi clan
21st Century Association
Armenian mafia
Mirzoyan-Terdjanian organization
Armenian Power
Azeri mafia
Janiev organization
Chechen mafia (See also Special Purpose Islamic Regiment and Kadyrovtsy)
Obschina
Labazanov gang

Europe

Sweden
Original Gangsters
Fucked For Life
Uppsalamaffian
Chosen Ones
Werewolf Legion
Asir
Vårvädersligan

Netherlands
Organized crime in the Netherlands
Bruinsma drug gang
Holleeder gang
Moroccan mafia

France
French Milieu (See also Service d'Action Civique)
Corsican mafia (see also National Liberation Front of Corsica)
Unione Corse
Brise de Mer gang
Les Caïds Des Cités
Faïd gang
The Barbarians
Wigs gang
North African Brigade (see also Carlingue)
Tractions Avant gang
Bande des Trois Canards
French gypsy gangs
Hornec gang

Greece
Greek mafia

Ireland
Ireland
Dublin
Cahill gang
Gilligan gang
Foley gang
Hyland gang
Dunne gang
The Westies
Limerick
McCarthy-Dundon
Keane-Collopy
Rathkeale Rovers
Kinahan Organised Crime Group

Spain
Spain (see also ETA)
Galician mafia
Romani clans
El Clan De La Paca

Poland
Poland (See also Group 13)
Pruszków mafia
Wołomin mafia

Slovakia
Slovak mafia
Hungaro-Slovak mafia

Hungary
Raffael clan
Sztojka clan

Czech Republic
Mrázek organization
Krejčíř organization

Italy
Sicilian Mafia
Sicilian Mafia Commission
Mandamenti
See also List of Sicilian Mafia clans
Cuntrera-Caruana Mafia clan
Inzerillo Mafia clan
Corleonesi
Greco Mafia clan
Motisi Mafia clan
'Ndrangheta
La Provincia
See also List of 'ndrine
Honoured Society (Melbourne)
Mammoliti 'ndrina
Bellocco 'ndrina
Cataldo 'ndrina
Commisso 'ndrina
Cordì 'ndrina
De Stefano 'ndrina
Pesce 'ndrina
Barbaro 'ndrina
Piromalli 'ndrina
Serraino 'ndrina
Siderno Group
Camorra
Secondigliano Alliance
Licciardi clan
Contini clan
Lo Russo clan
Mallardo clan
Di Lauro Clan
Casalesi clan
Fabbrocino clan
Vollaro clan
Scissionisti di Secondigliano
La Torre clan
Polverino clan
Rinaldi clan
De Luca Bossa clan
Aprea-Cuccaro clan
Cesarano clan
Puca clan
Sacra Corona Unita
Società foggiana
Stidda
Mala del Brenta
Banda della Magliana
Mafia Capitale
Sinti Casamonica clan
Clan Spada di Ostia
Milanese gangs
Banda della Comasina
Turatello crew

Balkans
Balkan organized crime gained prominence in the chaos following the communist era, notably the transition to capitalism and the wars in former Yugoslavia.

Albanian mafia
Kosovan mafia 'Albania
Gang of Çole
Gang of Gaxhai
Gang of Pusi i Mezinit
Lazarat marijuana growers
Rudaj Organization (New York City)
 Gang of Ismail Lika
Dobroshi gang (International)
Naserligan (Sweden)
K-Falangen (Sweden)
Bosnian mafia
Prazina gang
Bajramović gang
Delalić gang
M-Falangen (Sweden)
Bulgarian mafia (see also Multigroup)VIS
SIC
Karamanski gang
TIM
Naglite
Rashkov clan
Serbian mafia
Arkan clan
Zemun Clan
Joca Amsterdam gang
Magaš clan
Giška gang
Pink Panthers
Serb mafia in Scandinavia
Kotur mob
Yugoslav Brotherhood
Montenegrin mafia (see also allegations of Milo Đukanović's involvement in cigarette smuggling)Macedonian mafia
Frankfurt mafia
Bajrush klan
Nezim klan'
Romanian mafia
Băhăian organisation

Great Britain

London
Adams crime family
The Richardson GangMorton, James Gangland Volume 2: The Underworld in Britain and Ireland, 1995, 
The Firm
The Syndicate
Comer gang
Buttmarsh Boys
Interwar era mobs
Messina Brothers
Sabini syndicate
Hoxton Gang
Elephant and Castle Mob
Birmingham Boys
Essex Boys
Manchester
Quality Street Gang
Noonan firm
Cheetham Hillbillies
The Gooch Close Gang
Liverpool
Curtis Warren's drug empire
Whitney gang
Aggi Crew
Glasgow
McGraw firm
Thompson firm
Delta Crime Syndicate
Brighton razor gangs
Bestwood Cartel

Ukraine
Ukrainian mafia
Donetsk Clan
Salem gang

Lithuania
Lithuanian mafia
Vilnius Brigade

Estonia
Estonian mafia/Obtshak
Linnuvabriku group

Transnistria
Transnistrian mafia

Australia

Sydney
5T gang (1985–1999)
Freeman gang (defunct)
Lenny's gang (1960s)
Mr Sin's gang
Razor gangs (1920s)
Melbourne
Carlton Crew
Moran family
Williams family
Pettingill family
Richmond gang
Perth
Salvator cartel

References

Further reading
 
 "Drug Wars". Frontline''. 2006. PBS.

External links

"Mexico: Drug Cartels a Growing Threat"—Worldpress, 2006

 
Illegal drug trade
Organized crime groups
Organized crime terminology
Smuggling
Transnational organized crime